Life in 1472 is the debut studio album by American producer and rapper Jermaine Dupri, released via So So Def in the United States on July 21, 1998. 1472 refers to J (being the 10th letter of the alphabet) + D (representing the 4th letter of the alphabet), and 72 (the year of Dupri's birth, 1972). It produced the singles "Money Ain't a Thang" (US No. 52), "Sweetheart" (US No. 125), "The Party Continues" (US No. 29), and "Going Home with Me". Life In 1472 spent two weeks at number one on the Top R&B/Hip-Hop Albums chart, while breaking the top 5 on the Billboard 200 and selling 162,000 copies in its first week. The album was certified Gold by the Recording Industry Association of America (RIAA) on August 19th, 1998. A platinum certification followed on September 2nd, 1998.

Release and promotion
Life in 1472 was released on July 21, 1998, in the United States. In the United Kingdom, Columbia Records issued LPs and CDs on July 27. Sony Music Japan followed on July 29, and Sony Music Taiwan on August 5.

Track listing

Charts

Weekly charts

Year-end charts

Certifications

References

See also
List of number-one R&B albums of 1998 (U.S.)

Jermaine Dupri albums
1998 debut albums
Albums produced by Jermaine Dupri
Albums produced by Kanye West
Albums produced by DJ Premier
Albums produced by DJ Quik